The University of Bordeaux 1 was one of the four universities in the Academy of Bordeaux, together with the Bordeaux Segalen University (Bordeaux 2), Michel de Montaigne University (Bordeaux 3) and Montesquieu University (Bordeaux 4), and one of five in Aquitaine. On 1 January 2014, it merged with Bordeaux 2 and Bordeaux 4 to form the University of Bordeaux. It currently operates as the Talence campus of the merged University of Bordeaux.

It houses many important laboratories, such as:
 Centre de Neurosciences Intégratives et Cognitives (CNIC), a neuroscience research center
 Laboratoire Bordelais de Recherche en Informatique (LaBRI), a computer science research center

See also

University of Bordeaux
List of public universities in France by academy

References

University of Bordeaux
1
Bordeaux 1